The Coroner's Court of the Australian Capital Territory is a court which has exclusive jurisdiction over the remains of a person and the power to make findings in respect of the cause of death of a person or fire in Australian Capital Territory.

History
The office of coroner in the territory derives from the legal framework inherited from the United Kingdom.

Jurisdiction
At common law, coroners would constitute a court by virtue of their office.  In the Australian Capital Territory, this common law position has been abolished and there is now the Coroner’s Court established. 

Coroners have the power to investigate the causes of death within their jurisdiction. They also have power to retain a person’s remains, order autopsies, and direct how a person’s remains may be disposed. Coroners also have jurisdiction to hold inquests concerning the cause of any fire in the territory.

Where a serious criminal offence has been disclosed during the course of an inquest, the coroner cannot proceed with it if a person is to be charged with that criminal offence. The coroner stops the inquest and refers the matter to the Director of Public Prosecutions for consideration and investigation. This changes the early colonial practice of coroners directly committing persons suspected of serious crimes directly for trial.

Supreme Court of the Australian Capital Territory has a supervisory role over the court, and may review, quash or direct inquests.

In certain situations, the Attorney General may direct the Chief Coroner to conduct cause an inquiry to be held into a disaster in the territory.

Composition 
All magistrates are coroners by virtue of their appointment. The Chief Coroner may appoint a special magistrate as a coroner.

The Chief Magistrate of the Australian Capital Territory is the Chief Coroner for the territory. The Chief Coroner has the function to oversee and co-ordinate coronial services in the territory, ensure that all deaths and suspected deaths concerning which a coroner has jurisdiction to hold an inquest are properly investigated, and ensuring that an inquest is held whenever it is required, and to issue guidelines to coroners to assist them in the exercise or performance of their functions.

Membership

Chief Coroner

Coroners

Process 
Coroners must investigate the manner and cause of death for persons who die or may have died in certain circumstances. This includes people who:

 dies violently, or unnaturally, in unknown circumstances; 
 dies under suspicious circumstances;
 dies  and  the  death  appears to be completely or partly attributable to an operation or procedure;
 dies and a doctor has not given a certificate about the cause of death;
 dies  not  having  been  attended  by  a  doctor  at  any  time  within the period commencing 6 months before the death; or
 dies after  an  accident  where the  cause  of  death  appears  to  be directly attributable to the accident; or
 dies, or is suspected to have died, in circumstances that, in the opinion  of  the Attorney-General, should be better  ascertained;
 dies in custody.

They are required, where possible, to establish: the identity of the deceased; when and where the death happened; the manner and cause of death, and in the case of the suspected death of a person — that the person has died.

The coroner will initially ask police to investigate and provide a report to the coroner.

Coroners can then either decide to waive a hearing where it is not necessary or decide to hold a public hearing.

Significant inquests and/or inquiries
Notable inquests include:

The Royal Canberra Hospital implosion;
 The Murder of Colin Winchester; and
 The 2003 Canberra bushfires.

References

External links
Homepage of ACT Coroners Court - http://webarchive.loc.gov/all/20011116004831/http://www.courts.act.gov.au/magistrates/index.html
Coroners Act 1997 (ACT) http://www.austlii.edu.au/au/legis/act/consol_act/ca1997120/

Australian Capital Territory courts and tribunals
Australian Capital Territory